Anna Ivanovna Bogaliy (born 12 June 1979) is a retired Russian biathlete. She is 167 cm tall and weighs 58 kg.

She has had eleven podium finishes, three in first place, four in second, and has come third four times. At the 2006 Winter Olympics, Bogaliy won gold on the 4 × 6 km relay. At the World Championships, she won three gold medals in relays, including a recent title in mixed relay in Holmenkollen.

Results

Olympic Games

World Championships

References 
 IBU's official website

External links
 

1979 births
Living people
People from Vozhegodsky District
Russian female biathletes
Olympic biathletes of Russia
Biathletes at the 2002 Winter Olympics
Biathletes at the 2006 Winter Olympics
Biathletes at the 2010 Winter Olympics
Olympic gold medalists for Russia
Olympic medalists in biathlon
Biathlon World Championships medalists
Medalists at the 2010 Winter Olympics
Medalists at the 2006 Winter Olympics
Sportspeople from Vologda Oblast